The 1995 European Parliament election in Sweden was the election of Members of the European Parliament representing the Sweden constituency for the 1995–1999 term of the European Parliament.

Austria, Finland and Sweden acceded to the Union on 1 January 1995. 59 delegates (21 from Austria, 16 from Finland, 22 from Sweden) were appointed to the Parliament on accession, bringing the total up to 626. Elections to elect the 22 MEPs for Sweden were held on 17 September 1995 and the now-elected MEPs took their seats with effect from 9 October 1995.

Results by group

The results by political group of the Sweden election were as follows:

Results

References

External links
 European Parliament Information Office in Sweden page on former members (in Swedish) (translated into English)

1995 European Parliament election
European Parliament elections in Sweden
1995 elections in Sweden
September 1995 events in Europe